Keléstia Productions publishes role-playing materials for use with Hârn, a fictitious setting. Keléstia Productions was created by N. Robin Crossby, the original creator of Hârn, after a contract dispute with publisher Columbia Games proved irresolvable.

Keléstia Productions is known for the incredible detail and high design standards of its online products. As of this writing, Kelestia Productions produces no printed materials. A community of dedicated fans produces additional highly-detailed supplements.

Despite disagreements between Keléstia Publications and rival Columbia Games, the products produced by both entities are completely compatible either "as-is" or with the use of simple conversion information available freely through the fan community. The fan community produces additional high-quality supplements that are compatible with both Columbia Games and Kelestia Productions products.

Since the death of N. Robin Crossby, Keléstia Productions has continued as company owned by Crossby's estate, principally producing products describing the wider world beyond Hârn.

History
N. Robin Crossby left Columbia Games in 1994, after the company had been publishing material for his world of Hârn for over a decade. Columbia initially maintained their rights to Hârn, but Crossby eventually self-published Hârnmaster Gold (1998), Crossby's competitor to Columbia's own Hârn RPG.

In 2003 Crossby terminated his contract with Columbia Games and formed Keléstia Productions to continue Hârn publications of his own. Columbia refused to recognize Crossby's ability to terminate their agreement but Crossby nonetheless proceeded to publish on his own. Keléstia's production was limited to PDFs, which started out with a new edition of the Hârnmaster Gold Player Edition (2003), followed by a few other rule books. Beyond that Crossby began to present information on some of the other islands near Hârn, including The Kingdom of Chelemby (2005) and Hârbáaler Kingdom of Lédenheim (2008). Kèthîra (2005) presented an overview of the entire world of Hârn.

Crossby became sick around 2006 and died in 2008. Since then, his eldest daughter, Arien, has continued Keléstia's publication of what Crossby labelled as "Hârn Canon". Books postdating Crossby's death, such as Venârivè: Northwestern Lýthia (2010) emphasize Keléstia's commitment to detailing the wider world of Hârn, not just rehashing the Kingdoms on the nominal island.

In September, 2009, Keléstia was also granted a trademark to the name Hârn by the Canadian Intellectual Property Office.

Publications
Keléstia Productions Ltd has produced a range of publications which detail the world of Hârn, including:
 Venârivè: Northwestern Lýthia - describes the whole region of the continent of Lýthia where the island of Hârn is located. The region of 'Venârivè' is broadly analogous to Europe.
 Venârive Player Guide - a guide for players of characters in the region of Venârivè.
 Kingdom of Chélemby - a guide to the realm of Chélemby, an island trading-state somewhat analogous to historical Visby.
 Chéler Player Guide - a guide for players of characters from or visiting the realm of Chélemby.
 Chélemby: City of the Sea Kings - a detailed description of the city of the same name.
 Evánekin: Naval Port of Chélemby.
 Kolâdis: Castle Town of Chélemby.
 Hârn Interactive Regional Map.

In addition, Keléstia Productions provides the following components of the HârnMaster system:
 HârnMaster Gold: Player Edition
 HârnMaster Gold: Gamemaster Edition
 HârnMaster Gold: Bestiary
 HârnMaster Gold: Shèk-Pvâr

References

External links
Homepage of Keléstia Productions

Role-playing game publishing companies